The Last Defender of Camelot is an anthology of science fiction and fantasy short stories by American writer Roger Zelazny.

Contents
This is a list of the short stories included in the 1980 edition.  The ones with UM were only in the limited Underwood-Miller editions.

 "Passion Play" 
 "Horseman!" 
 "The Stainless Steel Leech" 
 "A Thing of Terrible Beauty" 
 "He Who Shapes" 
 "Comes Now the Power" 
 "Auto-Da-Fe" 
 "Damnation Alley" (magazine version) 
 "For a Breath I Tarry" 
 "The Engine at Heartspring's Center" 
 "The Game of Blood and Dust" 
 "No Award" 
 "Is there a Demon Lover in the House?" 
 "The Last Defender of Camelot" 
 "Stand Pat, Ruby Stone" 
 "Halfjack" 
 "Exeunt Omnes" (UM) 
 "Fire And/Or Ice" (UM) 
 "Shadowjack" (UM) 
 "A Very Good Year" (UM)

References

1980 short story collections
Short story collections by Roger Zelazny
Pocket Books books